The name Jenny has been used for five tropical cyclones world wide, once in the Atlantic Ocean, and twice in the Philippines in the Western Pacific Ocean, where it replaced the name "Juaning" after the 2011 Pacific typhoon season.

In the Atlantic:
 Hurricane Jenny (1961) – did not affect land.
 Tropical Storm Jenny (1969) – a weak tropical storm which affected Cuba and the U.S. Gulf Coast.

In the Western Pacific:
 Typhoon Dujuan (2015) (T1521, 21W, Jenny) – a powerful typhoon which struck the Ryukyu Islands, Taiwan, and Fujian.
 Tropical Storm Podul (2019) (T1912, 13W, Jenny) – made landfall in the Philippines and later in Vietnam.

In the South-West Indian:
 Cyclone Jenny (1962) – struck Reunion; killed 36.

See also
 Hurricane Jennifer, a name formerly used in the Eastern Pacific Ocean.

Atlantic hurricane set index articles
Pacific typhoon set index articles